Nadvirna Raion is a raion (district) of Ivano-Frankivsk Oblast (region).  The town of Nadvirna is the administrative center of the raion. Population: .

On 18 July 2020, as part of the administrative reform of Ukraine, the number of raions of Ivano-Frankivsk Oblast was reduced to six, and the area of Nadvirna Raion was significantly expanded. Yaremche Municipality was merged into Nadvirna Raion. The January 2020 estimate of the raion population was 

In 2015 oil production stopped in the raion (due to the license expiration).

Subdivisions

Current
After the reform in July 2020, the raion consisted of 8 hromadas:
 Deliatyn settlement hromada with the administration in the urban-type settlement of Deliatyn, retained from Nadvirna Raion;
 Lanchyn settlement hromada with the administration in the urban-type settlement of Lanchyn, retained from Nadvirna Raion;
 Nadvirna urban hromada with the administration in the city of Nadvirna, retained from Nadvirna Raion;
 Pasichna rural hromada with the administration in the selo of Pasichna, retained from Nadvirna Raion;
 Pererisl rural hromada with the administration in the selo of Pererisl, retained from Nadvirna Raion.
 Polianytsia rural hromada with the administration in the selo of Polianytsia, transferred from Yaremche Municipality;
 Vorokhta settlement hromada with the administration in the urban-type settlement of Vorokhta, transferred from Yaremche Municipality;
 Yaremche urban hromada with the administration in the city of Yaremche, transferred from Yaremche Municipality.

Before 2020

Before the 2020 reform, the raion consisted of five hromadas:
 Deliatyn settlement hromada with the administration in Deliatyn;
 Lanchyn settlement hromada with the administration in Lanchyn;
 Nadvirna urban hromada with the administration in Nadvirna;
 Pasichna rural hromada with the administration in Pasichna;
 Pererisl rural hromada with the administration in Pererisl.

People 
 Mariyka Pidhiryanka, a Ukrainian poet, best remembered for her children's poetry
 Bohdan Beniuk, a Ukrainian actor of theater and cinema, politician, People's Artist of Ukraine

References

 
Raions of Ivano-Frankivsk Oblast
Oil fields in Ukraine
1940 establishments in Ukraine